The Canadian Football League (CFL) has played numerous neutral site games in its history – i.e. games outside of both teams' home cities.

Several CFL games have been staged in the United States – the earliest was in 1909, and the most recent was in 1995 during the league's short-lived US expansion.

In the 2005 preseason, and regular seasons of 2010, 2011 and 2013, games in Atlantic Canada were billed as Touchdown Atlantic. The event was on hiatus from 2014 to 2018, but returned in 2019, 2022, and 2023.

In 2013, the Hamilton Tiger-Cats played most of their season in Guelph, Ontario, due to the reconstruction of Tim Hortons Field at the former Ivor Wynne Stadium. In 2015, games were moved to locations including Fort McMurray, Alberta, as some CFL stadiums were used for the Women's World Cup, Pan-American Games and baseball playoffs.

Location maps

List of games
Below is a list of games played by teams from the CFL, and its predecessors the Interprovincial Rugby Football Union and Western Interprovincial Football Union, outside the home city of both teams.

Note: Not included are Grey Cup games, which are played annually at a neutral site. Also not included are interleague games – for example, games between American football and CFL teams, or games where CFL teams played against Ontario Rugby Football Union, Quebec Rugby Football Union or Canadian Intercollegiate Rugby Football Union. These Unions competed for the Grey Cup, or its predecessor the Canadian Dominion Football Championship, in the early years.

Notes
  Cancelled as a result of the Ottawa Renegades suspending operations.
  The 2020 CFL season was canceled and 2021 season shortened due to the COVID-19 pandemic, resulting in a cancellation of the originally scheduled neutral site games.

Future games
In 2018, Mexico was suggested by Commissioner Randy Ambrosie as a possible location for neutral site regular season games (similar to the NFL's Mexico Series), as early as 2019.

See also
 Touchdown Atlantic
 Canadian Football League in the United States
 CFL USA all-time records and statistics
 List of Canadian Football League stadiums
 Canadian Football League attendance

References

History of the Canadian Football League
Canadian football in the United States